"Hypnotized" is a 2022 song by English singer Sophie Ellis-Bextor and Scottish musician Wuh Oh.

Background 
The song was written by Wuh Oh and Sophie Ellis-Bextor, and produced by Wuh Oh and Sega Bodega. It was first performed live by Ellis-Bextor on her Kitchen Disco Tour in March 2022. In May, a snippet of the song was previewed by Bodega on his social media. "Hypnotized" was expected to appear on Ellis-Bextor's next studio album, Hana, but it eventually did not feature in the final tracklist. A live version of the song was included on the concert album Kitchen Disco – Live at the London Palladium.

"Hypnotized" was described as an "avant-pop", "disco pop", "icy club banger".

Ellis-Bextor performed the song on the Yarra River for the Australian breakfast TV show Sunrise.

Music video 
The music video was directed by Ellis-Bextor's longtime collaborator Sophie Muller and filmed at Glasgow's Barrowland Ballroom. The cinematographer was Robbie Ryan. The video pictures Ellis-Bextor clad in a tight black latex dress in a Dita Von Teese-inspired styling, performing sharp dance routines in front of a group of dancers in an abandoned theatre, leading them in a hypnotic cult-like manner. It also features Wuh Oh playing music at the DJ deck. The clip premiered on 26 July 2022.

Track listings 
Digital download/streaming
"Hypnotized" – 3:03

Digital download/streaming (Sega Bodega Version)
"Hypnotized" (Sega Bodega Version) – 2:41

Digital download/streaming (Remixes)
"Hypnotized" (PS1 Remix) – 3:00
"Hypnotized" (PS1 Remix - Extended Version) – 3:55
"Hypnotized" – 3:03
"Hypnotized" (Sega Bodega Version) – 2:41
"Hypnotized" (Extended Version) – 3:32

Streaming (Live)
"Hypnotized" (Live) – 3:10
"Like a Prayer" (Live) – 5:07

Charts

References 

2022 songs
2022 singles
Sophie Ellis-Bextor songs
Nu-disco songs
Songs written by Sophie Ellis-Bextor